Seyyed Taj ol Din (also Romanized as Seyyed Tāj ol Dīn and Seyyed Tāj od Dīn; also known as Saiyid Hāji, Seid-Khadzhi, Seyyed Ḩājī, Seyyed Ḩājīm, Seyyed Ḩājīn, and Seyyed Ḩājjīn) is a village in Qarah Su Rural District of the Central District of Khoy County, West Azerbaijan province, Iran. At the 2006 National Census, its population was 2,490 in 482 households. The following census in 2011 counted 2,575 people in 669 households. The latest census in 2016 showed a population of 2,612 people in 736 households; it was the largest village in its rural district.

References 

Khoy County

Populated places in West Azerbaijan Province

Populated places in Khoy County